The 1954 Georgia Tech Yellow Jackets football team represented  the Georgia Institute of Technology during the 1954 college football season. The Yellow Jackets were led by 10th-year head coach Bobby Dodd and played their home games at Grant Field in Atlanta. They competed in the Southeastern Conference, finishing second behind Ole Miss. Georgia Tech accepted an invitation to the 1955 Cotton Bowl Classic, where they defeated Southwest Conference champion Arkansas, 14–6.

Schedule

Sources:

References

Georgia Tech
Georgia Tech Yellow Jackets football seasons
Cotton Bowl Classic champion seasons
Georgia Tech Yellow Jackets football